Odd Carl Arthur Borg (May 26, 1931 – November 13, 1965) was a Norwegian actor and singer. He was engaged with the Central Theater from 1953 to 1960, and with the National Theater from 1960 until his death. Borg was found dead behind the Amphitheater Stage after the premiere of the play Hva skal vi gjøre? by Klaus Rifbjerg and Jesper Jensen.

As a singer, he recorded the song "Jeg plystrer mens jeg går" (I Whistle While I Walk) on a gramophone record in 1957. It was a Norwegian version of the American hit "Just Walkin' in the Rain." As an actor, he is remembered for roles such as the intolerable daddy's boy and shipowner Rieber-Larsen Jr. in Operasjon Løvsprett, as a naval commander in Operasjon Sjøsprøyt, and the male lead role in Støv på hjernen. The same year he died, he starred in the next to last Stompa film, Stompa forelsker seg.

Odd Borg was married to the dancer Anne Borg. Borg was a cousin of the Olsen Gang director Knut Bohwim.

Filmography

 1955: Bedre enn sitt rykte
 1956: Kvinnens plass
 1956: Gylne ungdom
 1956: Ektemann alene
 1957: Peter van Heeren
 1957: Selv om de er små
 1959: 5 loddrett
 1959: Støv på hjernen
 1961: Line
 1961: Sønner av Norge
 1962: Operasjon løvsprett
 1964: Operasjon sjøsprøyt
 1964: Nydelige nelliker
 1965: To på topp
 1965: Stompa forelsker seg

References

External links
 
 Odd Borg at the Swedish Film Database
 Odd Borg at Filmfront
 Odd Borg at the National Theatre

1931 births
1965 deaths
20th-century Norwegian actors